This is a list of gliders/sailplanes of the world, (this reference lists all gliders with references, where available) 
Note: Any aircraft can glide for a short time, but gliders are designed to glide for longer.

British miscellaneous constructors 

 Aeronca C-2 glider
 Airdisco Phi-Phi – Aircraft Disposal Company
 Armstrong-Whitworth A.W.52G
 Birmingham Guild BG-100
 Birmingham Guild BG-135
 Bolton 1932
 Bramingham 1934
 Breeze Oozle Bird
 Bristol Glider (1910)
 Broburn Wanderlust – Broburn Sailplanes Ltd, Woodley
 Brokker (glider)
 Brown 1931 glider
 Chard Osprey – Keith Chard
 Cody UK Aircraft n°1 glider
 Colditz Cock
 Cramlington Cramcraft – Cramlington Aircraft Ltd
 Czerwiński-Shenstone Harbinger – Beverley Shenstone and Waclaw Czerwiński
 Davies Glider-1
 Davies Glider-2
 Davis-Costin Condor
 Davis Condor 2
 de Havilland DH.52 – de Havilland Aircraft Co
 Dickson Primary - Devon Gliding Club
 Dorsling 1932 glider – Dorset Gliding Club
 Dunning 1934 glider – Dunning, Southdown Gliding Club
 Edgley EA-9 Optimist – ESL (Edgley Sailplanes Ltd) & EAL (Edgley Aeronautics Ltd) – Edgley, John
 Eggleton 1912
 Enser Mk.1 – Enser, F.G.
 Etheridge 1933 – Day, S. & Etheridge, C. & Etheridge, P.
 Europa MG – Europa Management Ltd
 Farrar-McFarlane biplace – Farrar, D. J. & McFarlane, L. G.
 Gardner Cumulus – Gardner, L.
 Ginn-Lesniak Kestrel – Ginn, Vic & Lesniak – London Gliding Club, Dunstable
 Godwin Two-seater glider – Godwin, C. G.
 Gordon England 1922 glider – Gordon England, E. C – Georges England Ltd, Walton-on-Thames, Surrey
 Handasyde 1922 glider – Handasyde, G.A. & Raynham, F. P. & Camm, Sydney – Air Navigation Co, Addlestone, Vhertsey, Surrey
 Handley Page glider 1909
 Hewitt 1909 glider- Hewitt, V. V. D.
 Hick Merlin – Hick, W. Eddie, Newcastle Gliding Club
 Holdsworth 1929 glider – Holdsworth, H.
 Holdsworth 1931 glider – Holdsworth, H.
 Holmes KH-1 – Kenneth Holmes
 Hulton 1969 hang glider
 IOW Club glider – Isle of Wight gliding club
 Jefferson 1933 glider – Jefferson, G. Fearnville Grove, Roundhay, Leeds
 Keith-Weiss Aviette – Keith, Alexander & WEISS, José
 Kenilworth Me7
 KL biplane glider
 Latimer-Needham Albatross – Latimer-Needham, C. H. – R.F.D. Co, Guilford
 Lee-Richards 1912 glider
 Leeming L.P.W.
 Lightwing Type 4 Rooster
 Liverpuffin – Sherwin – man-powered glider
 Lowe-Wylde Columbus – Lowe-Wylde, Charles H.
 McAvoy MPA-1 – man-powered aircraft
 McIntyre Airglow – Mac Intyre, John & Mac Intyre, Mark
 Merriam 1922 glider – Merriam, Capt F. W.
 Midland Sailplane – Midland Gliding Club
 Miles M.76 Durestos Glider Wing – F.G. Miles Ltd.
 Monk Pegasus
 Moore Gypsy – The Birmingham Guild Ltd.
 Mulliners Aeroplane
 Norfolk 1936 glider – Norfolk Gliding Club, Skeyton
 Nyborg T.G.N.1 – Nyborg T. G.
 Oxford Club 1930 glider – Oxford Gliding Club
 Payne Granta – Payne, A. G.
 Payne I.C.1 – Payne, J. H. – Imperial College, London
 Peak 100 – The Bedford Sailplane Design Group – Peak Sailplanes Ltd.
 Peak 200 – Mitchelmore, P.
 Penrose Pegasus – Penrose, Harald J.
 Perkins Reluctant Phoenix – Perkins, Daniel – man-powered aircraft
 Porte-Pirie 1909 glider – John Cyrill Porte and Pirie
 Puffin 1 – man-powered aircraft
 Puffin 2 – man-powered aircraft
 Radlock Trainer – Raddings, J. E. & Locke, W. E. – Hull Gliding Club, Hedon, Yorkshire
 Reid Small Glider – Reid, J. A. I.
 Renaut Primary
 Reynard R.4 Primary – Reynard, – Reynard Glider Construction Co, Aylestone, Leicester
 Reynolds R.4 Primary
 Ridley 1910 glider – Ridley, C.
 Robertson Bamboo – Robertson, A.
 Ryley Dragon-Fly 1914 – Ryley, Leslie G. – Ryley, Leslie G., Coventry Aero Club
 Sayers SCW – Sayers, W. H. & Courtney, & Wright – Central Aircraft Company
 Searby Special – Searby, H. A.
 Sellars KJS-1 – Sellars, J. L. & Jordan, K.
 Shackleton Lark – Shackleton, William Stancliffe
 Sigma
 Smith Norbet 1923
 Southdown Aero Services Colditz Cock replica
 Sproule-Ivanoff Camel – Sproule, J. S. & Ivanoff, A. – Scott Light Aircraft Ltd
 Stedman TS-1 City of Leeds – Stedman, R. F. – Stedman R. F. / Bradford & County Gliding Club
 Swales SD3-15 – Swales Developments
 Technicair Trainee – Technicair Ltd. Heston, Middlesex
 Timmins 1930 glider – Timmins, Dennis
 To Phoenix Inflatable – To, Frederick E. – Phoenix Team – Man powered aircraft
 Toucan 1 – Hertfordshire Pedal Aeronauts – man powered aircraft
 Turkey Buzzard
 Vaughan 1909 glider – Vaughn, Horace
 Walther Boffin-Coffin – man-powered aircraft
 Watson-Northrop 1929 – Watson, J. P.
 Wenham Multiplane 1858
 Westmacott Skylark – Westmacott, R. J. & Westmacott, K.
 Wilkinson Mk 1
 Wilkinson Mk 2
 Yorkshire Sailplanes YS-53 Sovereign
 Yorkshire Sailplanes YS-55 Consort

Notes

Further reading

External links

Lists of glider aircraft